Devi 2 (stylized as Devi+2) is a 2019 Indian Tamil-language comedy horror film co-written and directed by A. L. Vijay. It is a sequel to the 2016 film Devi. The film features Prabhu Deva and Tamannaah reprising their roles from the first film, along with Nandita Swetha, and Dimple Hayathi in the lead roles. The film marked Dimple's Tamil film debut. Kovai Sarala, Ajmal Ameer, RJ Balaji, and Saptagiri play supporting roles. The film was simultaneously shot in Telugu as Abhinetri 2. The film released on 31 May 2019.

Plot 
  
Krishna and his wife Devi arrive in Mauritius for Krishna's work, leaving their daughter with Devi's parents. As the story moves, Devi meets with Lawyer Lalitha. They became friends that night. Krishna wakes up and closes the door which was open, but it opens again suddenly. Next, Devi becomes suspicious of Krishna because a colleague hugged him. She makes this as an issue and asks him to promise on their daughter's photo to which he says that it is casual and that he will not make a big deal out of it. Again, in the middle of the night, Krishna wakes up and closes the door, but the door suddenly opens after he left.

The next day, Devi sees Krishna (aka Alex) with Sara and again became suspicious of Krishna. She asks him about it, but he replied that it was someone else and that he was at his office, and if there is any doubt about him, she can visit him there. On his way to his office, Krishna encounters a gang who warns him not to follow Sara. Again, in the middle of the night, Krishna wakes up and closes the door, but the door suddenly opens after he left. The next day was their wedding anniversary, but Krishna seems to have forgotten it, so Devi was angry and did not give him lunch. After some time, Lalitha convinces Devi, so they both went to Krishna's office, where he was not there. On their way they again, they spot Krishna (aka Ranga) with Eesha. Lalitha mistakes Krishna going behind a girl because Devi does not have time for him after their childbirth, so Devi wears a modern dress to impress him, but he mistakes it as Ruby (from the previous film Devi(l)). However, Krishna finds that it is Devi and tells her that he likes her as she is and loves her only and that no woman will be in his life except her. He even promises on her daughter's photo.

The couple goes out the next day as it was Sunday, where Krishna goes to buy ice cream but suddenly, Devi sees him (Alex) with Sara again. The gang come to beat Krishna, but he escapes and is later seen with Eesha. The gang tries to beat Krishna (Ranga), but he gained the upper hand. While running behind a gang member, Krishna comes behind Devi with ice cream. Devi decides to find what is the mystery. Next, we see Devi speaking with Eesha's father where she finds out about Ranga Reddy, a person who wanted to marry Eesha but died in a car accident and she hasn't been able to recover her loss. Devi then starts following Sara, where it is shown that the latter is in a band whose head is Rudra. Devi learns about Alex Britto, who loves Sara but died. Again, we see the door being opened. Krishna closes it, but Devi, who was still awake, follows him and calls Alex and Ranga saying that he came. Devi then becomes terrified.

The next morning, Devi asks Krishna to urgently leave Mauritius as her mother was sick, but it backfired as they believed to have flown from India to Mauritius by the spirit in Krishna's body. On reaching the airport counter in Mauritius again Devi encounters with the same people and they on their flight to India, Krishna (Ranga and Alex) disappears and Devi is confused, is taken back to their home in Mauritius. Later Lalita visits Devi and find to be under the control of the ghost.

The two ghosts force this, made an agreement with her and with Lalitha as the witness and forcefully signs the contract. The two ghosts say that they chose Krishna because of Ruby's recommendation (the contract is the same as the first movie). On the first day, both Alex and Ranga possess him, which creates confusion, so Devi made a new agreement which states that from 9 AM to 3 PM, Alex can use him; from 3 PM to 9 PM, Ranga can use him; and when both of their girls who they try to woo say, "I love you", they have to leave him alone; and Sundays are holidays. We then come to know that there is a concert happening on Monday.

Devi and Lalitha help the ghost to woo their girls respectively by cooking up stories that they were the same girls whom his brother loved and he is now mentally unstable because both their lovers died and ask the girls to say "I love you" so that he can return to his normal state. At last, the girls decide to say it, but then Ganesan / Ganesh comes and ruins everything. The next day was Sunday. When the couple went out, they see Eesha and Sara talking to Krishna, where the girls (who are apparently sisters) learn that Krishna is not a crazy person and has been lying to them. A confused Krishna goes to his home with Devi where they are kidnapped, and it is revealed that Rudra is behind it and that he wanted to marry both of them for their money and that he killed both Ranga and Alex.

Alex then escapes and tries to kill Rudra. Devi tries to stop him. Meanwhile, Lalitha meets Eesha and asks her to say "I love you", and Rudra meets Sara and asks her to say "I love you". On Krishna's way to kill Rudra, Devi begs him, to which Alex pushes her, and she cries suddenly. Raj Khanna lifts her. It is revealed that he is the chief guest, and suddenly, a flashback rolls to the first film where he tells Krishna that if she cries, he will shoot him. Raj angrily follows Krishna to shoot him, and both ladies convey that they do not love Krishna but Ranga, and Sara still loves Alex. Both ghosts leave his body. However, Rudra spots Krishna and Raj. Both of them follow Krishna to kill him but mistakenly, Raj shoots Rudra instead of Krishna, and Krishna and Devi reconcile. At the final scene, we see that they both are leaving Mauritius, where Devi still has Ruby's nameplate.

Cast

Production 
A. L. Vijay announced a sequel of Devi and the lead cast Tamannaah, Prabhu Deva, Sonu Sood, RJ Balaji, and Saptagiri reprising their roles.

Reception 
The film released to negative reviews unlike the first film.

Soundtrack 
This film's soundtrack is composed by Sam C. S., replacing the predecessor film's music directors. While the lyrics for Tamil version of the film are written by Na. Muthukumar, Madhan Karky, Arunraja Kamaraj and Prabhu Deva, the lyrics for Telugu version of the film are written by Ramajogayya Sastry and Vanamali. The song "Chal Maar" is reused from the first part.

Tamil version

Telugu version

References

External links 
 

Films directed by A. L. Vijay
Films shot in Mauritius
Indian comedy horror films
Films scored by Sam C. S.
Indian sequel films
2010s Tamil-language films
2010s Telugu-language films
Indian multilingual films
2019 comedy horror films
2019 films
2019 multilingual films
Indian films with live action and animation